The Gorge Amphitheatre, originally known as Champs de Brionne Music Theatre, is an outdoor concert venue in Grant County, Washington, United States. The venue is managed by Live Nation.

It is a nine-time winner of Pollstar Magazine's award for 'Best Outdoor Music Venue' and was voted as one of the 'Best Outdoor Concert Venues in America' by ConcertBoom.

About

The original amphitheater was owned and operated by Dr. Vincent Bryan and Carol Bryan, along with the adjoining winery, Champs de Brionne, for which it was named. It opened in 1986 and seated 3,000 people, but had expanded to 19,000 prior to the purchase by MCA in 1993. The Gorge Amphitheater was acquired by Live Nation in 2006.

This venue offers views of the Columbia River, Columbia Gorge canyon, eastern Kittitas, and western Grant County. Originally, the land was planned to be used for growing grapes for wine.

Apart from drawing big name performers, The Gorge has also played host to an array of popular music festivals, including Area Festival, Creation Festival, Dave Matthews Band Caravan, H.O.R.D.E. Festival, Honda Civic Tour, Identity Festival, Lilith Fair, Lollapalooza, Ozzfest, Paradiso Festival, Rock the Bells Festival, Sasquatch! Music Festival, Uproar Festival, Vans Warped Tour, Pain in the Grass, and Watershed Festival as well as Phish, who has played 22 times since 1997.

Brooks & Dunn's "Only in America" video was filmed here on June 12, 2001.

The White River Amphitheatre opened in 2003, directly competing with the venue. The new amphitheater is substantially closer to Seattle, with a shorter travel time via car of 1.5 to 2.25 hours less, depending on traffic. A columnist for The Seattle Times noted the preferable view and "experience" offered by The Gorge.

As of 2022, Dave Matthews Band has played 70 shows at the venue, traditionally during their Labor Day weekend three-night run. The Gorge, a combination 2-CD/1-DVD set with highlights from their 3-night 2002 tour closer here was released on June 29, 2004. Additionally, their September 4, 2016 tour closer was released as Live Trax, Vol. 44 on December 8, 2017.

Pearl Jam (from Seattle) released a box set, featuring their entire performances from 2005 and 2006, aptly titled, Live at the Gorge 05/06.

About 400,000 people attended concerts at The Gorge Amphitheater in the year 2013. Above and Beyond hosted their 250th episode of Group Therapy Radio at The Gorge on September 16, 2017 to September 17, 2017.

A documentary film titled "Enormous: The Gorge Story" was released in 2021. The film focused on The Gorge and its music history.

Excision began hosting his weekend-long electronic music festival Bass Canyon here in August 2018. The second year of the festival took place on August 23–25, 2019 and featured artists such as Excision himself, Flux Pavilion, Zomboy, Wooli, Virtual Riot, Subtronics, Liquid Stranger, and many more.

Camping

Fans can stay in the campground for 24 hours on the day of a single show, or until 12 noon the day after a run of shows end. Camping at the Gorge requires buying a camping ticket, which can be included in the concert admission ticket.

The campground at the Gorge sets aside spaces for one car with up to two two-person tents or a single RV. There are very limited RV hookups at the Gorge campground. Sites are set aside by venue staff on a first-come, first-served basis. Potable water, flush toilets, hot showers, and a convenience store are available on the grounds. The campground also has 24-hour security.

See also
List of contemporary amphitheatres
List of music festivals

References

External links 

LiveNation Page

Amphitheaters in the United States
Buildings and structures in Grant County, Washington
Columbia River Gorge
Landmarks in Washington (state)
Music venues in Washington (state)
Tourist attractions in Grant County, Washington
1986 establishments in Washington (state)